Olga Rublyova (born 28 October 1974 in Volgograd) is a retired Russian long jumper.

Her personal best jump is 6.90 metres, achieved in June 1995 in Villeneuve-d'Ascq.

International competitions

References

 
 
 

1974 births
Living people
Russian female long jumpers
Olympic female long jumpers
Olympic athletes of Russia
Athletes (track and field) at the 1996 Summer Olympics
Athletes (track and field) at the 2000 Summer Olympics
World Athletics Championships athletes for Russia
Russian Athletics Championships winners
Sportspeople from Volgograd